Alan, Allan or Allen Bradley may refer to:

People
Alan Bradley (bowls) (born 1926), Rhodesian international lawn bowler
Alan Bradley (writer) (born 1938), Canadian mystery writer
Allan Bradley, British geneticist

Fictional
Alan Bradley (Coronation Street), a fictional character in the soap opera
Alan Bradley (TRON), a character in the TRON films

Companies
Allen-Bradley, a brand name of equipment manufactured by Rockwell Automation